A. C. Sreehari (born 1970, in Payyanur, Kerala) is a poet/writer in Malayalam literature. His poems are included in many anthologies of Malayalam writing, such as Yuvakavithakkoottam (Kottayam: D. C. Books, 1999), Kavithayute Noottaantu (Kottayam: S. P. C. S., 2001) and Palathu (Kottayam: D. C. Books, 2003). He is on the staff of the English Department of Payyanur College, Payyanur, affiliated with the University of Kannur, Kerala state, India.

Books

Awards

Literature Awards

References

External links 
 A poem by A. C. Sreehari 

1970 births
Living people
Indian male poets
Poets from Kerala
20th-century Indian poets
Malayalam-language writers
Malayalam poets
20th-century Indian male writers